The 2016 NCAA Division II football season, part of college football in the United States  organized by the National Collegiate Athletic Association (NCAA) at the Division II level, began on September 1, 2016 and ended with the NCAA Division II Football Championship on December 17, 2016 at Children's Mercy Park in Kansas City, Kansas.  Northwest Missouri State successfully defended their national title from the previous season, winning their sixth overall championship, by defeating North Alabama.

Conference changes and new programs

Membership changes

Mississippi College completed their transition to Division II and became eligible for the postseason.

Conference standings

Super Region 1

Super Region 2

Super Region 3

Super Region 4

Postseason
The 2016 NCAA Division II Football Championship Postseason involved 28 schools playing in a single-elimination tournament to determine the national champion of men's NCAA Division II college football.

The tournament began on November 19, 2016 and concluded on December 17, 2016 with the 2016 NCAA Division II National Football Championship game at Children's Mercy Park in Kansas City, Kansas.

Format
The top seven teams per super regional made up the field of 28 teams.

Twelve first-round games were conducted on the campus of one of highest seed of that matchup. In addition, one team per super regional earned first-round byes. Second-round winners met in the quarterfinals at the campus site of the highest seed. Quarterfinal winners advanced to play in the semifinals on the campus of the highest seed. The championship took place at Children's Mercy Park.

Qualifiers
The following teams were qualifiers for the 2016 NCAA Division II Football Tournament.

Super Regional One

Super Regional Two

Super Regional Three

Super Regional Four

† Overtime

Final Four
Teams that make it to the Final Four are re-seeded for the semifinal matches. The semifinal matchups are hosted by the team with the highest seed.

Bowl games

Attendances
2016 NCAA Division II football teams with an average home attendance of at least 10,000:

See also
2016 NCAA Division I FBS football season
2016 NCAA Division I FCS football season
2016 NCAA Division III football season
2016 NAIA football season

References